Erika Dobrovičová-Buriánová (born 10 September 1967) is a Slovak basketball player. She competed in the women's tournament at the 1988 Summer Olympics and the 1992 Summer Olympics.

References

1967 births
Living people
Slovak women's basketball players
Olympic basketball players of Czechoslovakia
Basketball players at the 1988 Summer Olympics
Basketball players at the 1992 Summer Olympics
Sportspeople from Prešov